Anan Wong, better known by the name Yin, is a Thai actor and model of Hong Kong descent. He is well known for his acting debut and leading role as "Vee" in En Of Love: Love Mechanics, which aired in 2020.

Early life and education 
Anan was born on October 1, 1998. His family consists of his father who is a native of Hong Kong, his Thai mother, an older sibling, and a grandmother who lives with them. He completed his secondary school at Sarasas Witaed Bangbon School. In 2021, Anan completed his bachelor's degree in Computer Engineering at Srinakharinwirot University (SWU), graduating with first class honors.

Career 
Pre-acting career, Anan joined Srinakharinwirot University's Open House Project, providing future students with useful information about the university and their subject areas. During these school events, people took pictures of him and shared them in various social media platforms. After seeing his photos, he was then contacted by the manager of his current agency, "Rookie Thailand", to do product reviews and modeling.

Anan made an appearance in GMMTV's "Jen Jud God Jig", where he was interviewed by the show's hosts, Jennie Panhan and Godji Tatchakorn.

Anan made his acting debut with a leading role in the Thai BL (boys' love) mini series "En of Love". En of Love was a project by Studio Wabi Sabi consisting of three stories adapted from three different novels about three couples. In March 2019, it was announced that he would be playing the role "Vee", a 3rd year engineering student and the main protagonist in the 2nd story of En of Love, titled "Love Mechanics".

Even with 3.5 short episodes, this particular story and couple in En of Love received the most love from fans in Thailand, as well as internationally, gaining millions of views on Line TV and on YouTube. The last episode of Love Mechanics earned more than 1 million tweets, trending in many different countries, and number one worldwide.

The success of the series along with the overflowing chemistry of the two lead actors launched the shipped couple called "YinWar", which is the combined name of Anan (Yin) with co-star Wanarat Ratsameerat (War). Despite their series having just a few episodes, this pair managed to become one of the most talked about in 2020, earning many endorsements, event and show appearances, and nominations in various award categories.

Due to the popularity of YinWar and En Of Love: Love Mechanics, in October 2020, a full series called "Love Mechanics The Series" was announced to air in 2021 under Studio Wabi Sabi, which would consist of 16 episodes in total. In early 2021, Rookie Thailand announced that Love Mechanics will no longer be produced by Studio Wabi Sabi. In September 2021, WeTV revealed that Love Mechanics will be part of their 2022 lineup. This series would be a collaboration between Rookie Thailand and WeTV, and will be directed by Lit Samajarn.

Alongside the announcement of the full series, Anan's new show with his on-screen partner Wanarat called "WxY" was also announced. It premiered in December 2020 on Rookie Thailand's YouTube channel.

Anan made his official singing debut when both him and Wanarat featured in a song called "Ta Taek", by Thai rappers, Milli and Wonderframe. The song was released in December 2020 on different music platforms and an official music video starring all four artists was also released on the same day on YouTube.

On March 10, 2021, Anan released his first official song "On Mai Keng", which is a duet with Wanarat.  On March 18, 2021, a week after the song's release date, an official music video featuring the two of them was uploaded on YouTube.

Rookie Thailand just released a statement: Yin Anan, War Wanarat, and Prom Ratchapat decided to be freelance actor, and their contract will expired on January 31, 2022.

Filmography

Television

Film

Music video appearances

Discography

Awards and nominations

Concerts

Personal life 
In July 2020, Anan, along with his labelmates and close friends Wanarat Ratsameerat and Ratchapat Worrasarn, launched their first clothing brand under the name "Sobyohey".

References

External links 

Anan Wong on Instagram

Anan Wong on YouTube
Anan Wong on Facebook

Anan Wong
Anan Wong
1998 births
Living people